Weekend at Dunkirk is a 1964 war drama film directed by Henri Verneuil and starring Jean-Paul Belmondo. It is based on the 1949 Prix Goncourt winning novel Week-end at Zuydcoote (French: Week-end à Zuydcoote) by Robert Merle.

Plot

Set during the Battle of Dunkirk, the film follows Julien Maillat, a French Army sergeant who tries to join the British Army on the Royal Navy's boat flotilla to England. No matter how hard he tries to make it, he and his French squad-mates and colleagues are hard-pressed to get away as the fight is getting harder and the Germans closer and closer.

Selected cast
 Jean-Paul Belmondo as Staff sergeant French Army Julien Maillat
 Catherine Spaak as Jeanne
 Jean-Pierre Marielle as a French military chaplain friend of Maillat
 François Périer as Alexandre
 Pierre Mondy as Dhéry
 Pierre Vernier as undertaker
 Paul Préboist as a soldier
 Ronald Howard as captain Robinson
 Eric Sinclair : le capitaine Clark
 Donald O'Brien as the English sergeant controlling the lines on the beach
 Kenneth Haigh : John Atkins
 Marie Dubois : Hélène, the French wife of Atkins
 Nigel Stock as the English sergeant carrying rocking horse and burned during a German attack
 Christian Barbier : Paul

Reception
The film was the ninth most popular movie at the French box office in 1964.

According to Fox records, the film needed to earn $1,700,000 in rentals to break even and made $1,755,000, meaning it made a profit.

References

External links

Weekend at Dunkirk at Le Film Guide

1964 films
1960s French-language films
1960s war drama films
Films directed by Henri Verneuil
Films set in 1940
Films set in Dunkirk
Dunkirk evacuation films
Films set on beaches
French war drama films
French World War II films
Western Front of World War II films
Films based on French novels
1964 drama films
1960s French films
Italian war drama films
Italian World War II films